Claudio Polledri (born 7 January 1936) is a Swiss épée and foil fencer. He competed at the 1960 and 1964 Summer Olympics.

References

External links
 

1936 births
Living people
Swiss male épée fencers
Olympic fencers of Switzerland
Fencers at the 1960 Summer Olympics
Fencers at the 1964 Summer Olympics
Sportspeople from Lugano
Swiss male foil fencers